Mathematical methods are integral to the study of electronics.

Mathematics in electronics
Electronics engineering careers usually include courses in calculus (single and multivariable), complex analysis, differential equations (both ordinary and partial), linear algebra and probability. Fourier analysis and Z-transforms are also subjects which are usually included in electrical engineering programs. Laplace transform can simplify computing RLC network behaviour.

Basic applications
A number of electrical laws apply to all electrical networks.  These include
Faraday's law of induction: Any change in the magnetic environment of a coil of wire will cause a voltage (emf) to be "induced" in the coil. 
Gauss's Law:  The total of the electric flux out of a closed surface is equal to the charge enclosed divided by the permittivity.
Kirchhoff's current law: the sum of all currents entering a node is equal to the sum of all currents leaving the node or the sum of total current at a junction is zero
Kirchhoff's voltage law: the directed sum of the electrical potential differences around a circuit must be zero.
Ohm's law: the voltage across a resistor is the product of its resistance and the current flowing through it.at constant temperature.
Norton's theorem: any two-terminal collection of voltage sources and resistors is electrically equivalent to an ideal current source in parallel with a single resistor.
Thévenin's theorem: any two-terminal combination of voltage sources and resistors is electrically equivalent to a single voltage source in series with a single resistor.
Millman's theorem: the voltage on the ends of branches in parallel is equal to the sum of the currents flowing in every branch divided by the total equivalent conductance.
 See also Analysis of resistive circuits.

Circuit analysis is the study of methods to solve linear systems for an unknown variable.

Circuit analysis

Components
There are many electronic components currently used and they all have their own uses and particular rules and methods for use.

Electronic components

Complex numbers and Complex Analysis
If you apply a voltage across a capacitor, it 'charges up' by storing the electrical charge as an electrical field inside the device. This means that while the voltage across the capacitor remains initially small, a large current flows. Later, the current flow is smaller because the capacity is filled, and the voltage raises across the device. Complex Analysis methods are also important in electrical engineering in fields such as signal processing, power electronics, control systems, and others

A similar though opposite situation occurs in an inductor; the applied voltage remains high with low current as a magnetic field is generated, and later becomes small with high current when the magnetic field is at maximum.

The voltage and current of these two types of devices are therefore out of phase, they do not rise and fall together as simple resistor networks do. The mathematical model that matches this situation is that of complex numbers, using an imaginary component to describe the stored energy.

Signal analysis
 Fourier analysis. Deconstructing a periodic waveform into its constituent frequencies; see also: Fourier theorem, Fourier transform.
 Nyquist–Shannon sampling theorem.
Information theory. Sets fundamental limits on how information can be transmitted or processed by any system.

Electronic engineering
Applied mathematics